Miss Belgium is a national beauty pageant in Belgium. The winner of Miss Belgium automatically represents her country at the Miss World and Miss Universe pageants if the dates do not overlap.

Rules
Belgian nationality
to be never married and without children
to have an age of 18 to 27 years ,

History

Queen of the Beach
The first contest looking for the most beautiful girl in Belgium was in 1928. It was journalist Jean-Jacques Fortis who organised the contest "La Reine de la Plage" - "The Queen of the Beach" as a promotion for the journal Piccolo, now Le Soir. It was Anne Koyaert who won the contest in Blankenberge.

Miss Belgium
Following the success, Fortis was allowed to organise a bigger election. In 1929, Jenny Vanparys was the first girl officially crowned Miss Belgium. She participated in Miss Europe. The next year, Netta Duchâteau was the winner. Duchâteau participated and won the International Pageant of Pulchritude in 1931, earning her the title "Miss Universe 1931". Duchâteau became an instant celebrity and the Miss Belgium contest got a lot of attention.

In 1968, Cécile Muller took interest in the contest. In 1969 she organised for the first time Miss Belgium. Muller, who thought herself to be a feminist, took the contest very serious. She demanded the participants of the contest to be bilingual - being able to talk Dutch and French, the two main languages of Belgium. Muller gave the participants training how to handle interviews. She also followed and guided the winner of the Miss Belgium-title very strictly. Thanks to the guidance of Muller, the contest became bigger every year. Muller saw the contest as an act of feminism and tried not to find the most beautiful face of Belgium but a modern young woman who could represent Belgium in every way. She succeeded on launching the contest at television. In 1993 the contest was broadcast on VTM for the Flanders region and at RTL for the Walloon region. A million viewers saw the elections of Miss Belgium that decennia. Many of those winners - including Goedele Liekens, Lynn Wesenbeek, Sandrine Corman, Dina Tersago and Julie Taton - had successful careers in television. For the election of 1994 a new golden crown was made by a crown maker of Paris.

In 2005, business woman Darline Devos became the new organiser of the election. She organized the election further. She succeeded in changing the preliminary provincial elections and applying the same rules in those contests. Every winner of those provincial contest was awarded one of the same eleven Swarovski-crowns. A new crown for Miss Belgium was made, consisting of 500 Swarovski-crystals. Devos also founded the Miss Belgium house, a house in the center of the country. It serves as the work place for the organisation of Miss Belgium and a place to stay for the reigning Miss Belgium. She made a new deal for the Dutch-speaking part of Belgium with broadcaster VT4. Although the girls of the next years were more successful at the Miss Universe and Miss World contests, the Belgian audience lost its interest in the election. Caused by declining viewership of the election, the contest was broadcast in the Dutch-speaking region by Vijftv, the small affiliate channel of VT4, in 2010-2011 and on digital broadcasters Life! in 2012, Studio 100 TV in 2013–2014, Ment TV in 2015, Fox Flanders in 2016-2018 and Eclips TV in 2019. In the French-speaking region broadcaster RTL stopped broadcasting the election in 2012. It was succeeded by digital broadcaster STAR TV in 2012 and AB3 in 2013–2018. Since 2019 the contest no longer broadcast in Wallonia. Additionally, the election also meets criticism in Wallonia because most winners are from Flanders.

Because of the COVID-19 pandemic, the election of Miss Belgium 2021 was postponed from January 2020 to March 2021. A new crown made of white stones and some pink stones as finisher debuted at the election of Miss Belgium 2021.

Reigning Miss Belgium, Chayenne Van Aarle, had a major car accident during her last week of her reign. Since she was still recovering she wasn't able to be present at the election of her successor. The Miss Belgium 2023 pageant show was postponed due to suspicions of a terrorist attack. A suspect was arrested, weapons were found in his car and after the venue was fully searched, the show started with a delay.

Controversy 
Miss Belgium was met with controversy at different occasions. Miss Belgium 1952, Anne-Marie Pauwels refused to part from her boyfriend during the contest of Miss World 1952. She was disqualified and Belgium wasn't allowed to participate at Miss World 1953.

In 1971, the Dolle Mina's jumped on stage during the final of the election, yelling “We are not cattle!”.

Miss Belgium 2002, Ann Van Elsen, was one of the candidates who refused to participate in the Miss World competition held in Nigeria in to protest the conviction of Amina Lawal. This was against the wishes of the Miss Belgium organisation. Van Elsen was replaced by her first runner-up Sylvie Doclot.

Miss Belgium 2006, Virginie Claes, was accused of buying her title. No proof of this was found. 

The election of Alizee Poulicek, a native speaker of French and Czech, has even been linked to the 2007–08 Belgian government formation. The reason is that, during the traditional language test, she failed to speak or understand Dutch. The audience even booed her for this. The behaviour of the audience was noted across Europe, and the Flemish newspaper Het Laatste Nieuws sarcastically put the headline "Miss Belgium doesn't speak Dutch. Our country is in a deep crisis".

Miss Belgium 2017, Romanie Schotte, was accused of racism because of a post at Instagram. An investigation was started by Unia (the Center of Equal Opportunities) on 17 January but it was already closed on 19 January. In 2018 however, Miss Belgium 2018 Angeline Flor Pua, was met with much racism after winning. The Secretary of State of Equal Opportunities Zuhal Demir dissaproved the racist comments and applauded the new Miss Belgium. The reaction of Flor Pua was well received and even broadcast on the BBC.

Titleholders

La Reine de la Plage

Pre-World War II

Post-World War II

Titleholders under Miss Belgium org.

Miss Universe Belgium

Miss Belgium has started to send a Miss Belgium to Miss Universe from 1952. On occasion, when the winner does not qualify (due to age) for either contest, a runner-up is sent.

Miss World Belgium

Media

Television
In 1993, the election of Miss Belgium debuted on television. Since then the election was broadcoasted every year.

In 2002 and 2003, VTM aired the docuseries Miss België, achter de schermen about the candidates and the preparation for the election show.  In 2008, when the show was moved to broadcoaster VT4, a new docusoap Wie wordt Miss België 2008 aired.

Books
In 1999, Miss Belgium-organiser Cécile Muller wrote a book about her 30 year experience of the contest and the 600 girls she guided.

In 2007 a book Een leven als Miss België was released. It included a timeline about the contest, interviews of 15 ex-winners and the diary of Miss Belgium 2007, Annelien Coorevits.

See also 
Mister Belgium Personality
Miss International Belgium
Miss Earth Belgium
Miss Belgian Beauty

References

External links 

 Miss België, Miss Belgique, Miss Belgien

 
Belgian awards
Recurring events established in 1969
1969 establishments in Belgium
Belgium